KESW may refer to:

 King Edward's School, Witley, a school in Wormley, Surrey, England
 KESW-LP, a low-power radio station (106.5 FM) licensed to Whitehall, Montana, United States